The Adventures of Billy is a 1911 silent short dramatic  film directed by D. W. Griffith. It is one of many Griffith shorts preserved by the paper print and is available for viewing today.

Cast
Edna Foster - Billy
Donald Crisp - First Tramp
Joseph Graybill - Second Tramp
Dell Henderson - Rich Man
Claire McDowell - Rich Woman
Kate Bruce - The Maid
Frank Evans - The Farmer
W. Chrystie Miller - Robbery Victim

uncredited
D. W. Griffith - On Bench
Grace Henderson - Woman on Porch
Harry Hide - On Lawn
Charles Hill Mailes - Farmhand/ Rescuer
Alfred Paget - Farmhand, Rescuer
Donald Crisp - thug

References

External links
 
The Adventures of Billy available for free download at Internet Archive

1911 films
American silent short films
American black-and-white films
Films directed by D. W. Griffith
Silent American drama films
1911 short films
1911 drama films
1910s American films
American drama short films
1910s English-language films